Aktepe Stadium is a multi-use stadium in Ankara, Turkey.  It is currently used mostly for football matches and is the home of Keçiörengücü. The stadium holds 5,000 people and was built in 1999.

Notes

Football venues in Turkey
Sports venues in Ankara
Sports venues completed in 1999
Osmanlıspor
1999 establishments in Turkey
Ankara Keçiörengücü SK